State Route 46 (SR 46) is an east–west state highway in the U.S. state of California. It is a major crossing of the Coast Ranges and it is the southernmost crossing of the Diablo Range, connecting SR 1 on the Central Coast near Cambria and US 101 in Paso Robles with SR 99 at Famoso in the San Joaquin Valley.

The road that is now SR 46 was built and improved during the 1920s and was fully paved by 1930. The majority of SR 46 was originally designated as U.S. Route 466; however, after the latter was entirely removed from the U.S. Highway system, the eastern portion of the route became SR 46.

Route description
It heads east as the Eric Seastrand Highway across the Santa Lucia Range on a relatively straight roadway built in the 1970s, bypassing the steep, curvy Santa Rosa Creek Road. After passing near several wineries, this first segment ends at US 101 north of Templeton, where SR 46 turns north, overlapping the US 101 freeway through the valley formed by the Salinas River to central Paso Robles. Immediately after splitting from US 101, SR 46 crosses the Salinas River, passing near the Paso Robles Municipal Airport, and then heads east through a hilly area with several wineries and the community of Whitley Gardens. It then runs partially alongside the Estrella River to a merge with SR 41 near Shandon and a rest area. There, it turns northeast, following Cholame Creek through Cholame Pass between the Cholame Hills and Temblor Range to the settlement of Cholame and the split with SR 41. After crossing into Kern County, the highway continues to rise as it heads east up the Antelope Grade to a summit near Bluestone Ridge before descending through Polonio Pass into the San Joaquin Valley. State Route 46 takes the southernmost crossing of the Diablo Range, which is one of the routes linking the Central Valley to the coast. Interstate 580, State Route 152, and State Route 46 are the major routes that cross the Diablo Range. This route is heavily used when the Grapevine is closed. Truckers who do not want to take SR 58 through Tehachapi can use this route to head to I-5 to the Bay Area, Northern California, and vice versa. Many people from the Bay Area also use this route to head to Tehachapi Pass to head to Interstate 40, the Antelope Valley, Las Vegas, and Mount Whitney if they do not want to use I-5.

Once it enters the San Joaquin Valley, SR 46, known as the Paso Robles Highway, follows an almost perfectly straight eastward alignment, crossing SR 33 at Blackwells Corner, passing through the Lost Hills Oil Field, and intersecting I-5 about  past Lost Hills and the crossing of the California Aqueduct. SR 46 and SR 43 overlap for a short distance in the city of Wasco, and then SR 46 passes over Calloway Canal and Friant Canal before it ends at SR 99 in Famoso. The county-maintained Famoso Road continues east across SR 65 and into the Sierra Nevada foothills.

East of Paso Robles, SR 46 is part of the California Freeway and Expressway System, and east of US 101 is part of the National Highway System, a network of highways that are considered essential to the country's economy, defense, and mobility by the Federal Highway Administration.  The highway from SR 1 to SR 41 near Cholame is an eligible State Scenic Highway, but it is not officially designated as a scenic highway by the California Department of Transportation.

History
As part of the second state highway bond issue, approved by the state's voters in 1916, Route 33 was created, linking the San Joaquin Valley trunk (Route 4, now SR 99) near Bakersfield with the coast trunk (Route 2, now US 101 in Paso Robles, passing through the Coast Ranges via Cholame Pass. The road was not yet built in 1919 when the Automobile Blue Book recommended only the county-maintained "very poor road" (now SR 58) via Simmler as a connection between the valley and Central Coast. By 1925, the Cholame Pass highway had been improved, and paving was completed in December 1930. An extension west to Route 56 (now SR 1) near Cambria was added in 1933; however, it ran along Santa Rosa Creek Road, north of today's alignment.

The state sign route system was established in 1934 but the majority of Route 33 did not receive a state route designation, instead becoming part of the new U.S. Route 466. However, US 466 turned southwest from Cholame Pass along Legislative Route 125 (modern SR 41) to Morro Bay. Sign Route 41, which followed Legislative Route 125 northeast of Cholame, continued along Route 33 west to the coast. However, Route 125 had still not been paved between Cholame and Atascadero by the 1950s and so US 466 was moved to the longer but better-quality Route 33 via Paso Robles, replacing SR 41 to Paso Robles and overlapping US 101 to Atascadero. As SR 41 had not been signed over the unpaved road west of Paso Robles, it was truncated to Cholame. US 466 was eliminated in the 1964 renumbering, becoming SR 46 east from Paso Robles. However, instead of going south and west to Morro Bay, SR 46 continued west to Cambria and the road via Creston and Atascadero to Morro Bay (which had since been paved) became part of SR 41. A new two-lane expressway carrying SR 46 west from Paso Robles was built in the mid-1970s, replacing Santa Rosa Creek Road.

The two-lane stretch from Paso Robles to Cholame was once known as 'Blood Alley' for the large number of vehicle incidents, mainly head-on collisions, among the high volume of commuters, truck drivers and tourists. Between 2000 and 2010, a total of 38 people were killed. As of 2016, 'Blood Alley' was widened to a four-lane expressway from the junction of US 101 to just east of the west junction of SR 41, near the town of Shandon. The east junction of the SR 46/SR 41 split is named after actor James Dean, who was killed in a car crash near this site on September 30, 1955.  The current intersection is now marked as the James Dean Memorial Junction. The junction was officially dedicated as the James Dean Memorial Junction on September 30, 2005 as part of the State of California's official commemoration of the 50th anniversary of Dean's death. However, this is not the actual intersection where the accident occurred, contrary to popular belief. The accident scene is about 100 feet to the south of the current intersection, where the road used to be.   The California Department of Transportation (Caltrans) carried out an interim safety project west of Cholame in December 1995, mandating daytime headlights and installing thermoplastic striping, a concrete barrier and rumble strips. Caltrans has plans to start widening the section between SR 33 and I-5 in 2017. There are also plans to upgrade SR 46 west of this segment and build an interchange with SR 41 at the James Dean Memorial Junction.

Major intersections

See also

References

External links

California Highway Conditions: SR 46
California Highways: State Route 46
California @ AARoads.com - State Route 46

046
State Route 046
State Route 046